Modrič may refer to:

Modrič, Struga, a village in southwestern Macedonia
Modrič, Slovenska Bistrica, a village in northeastern Slovenia
Modrič, Laško, a small settlement in eastern Slovenia
Modrič, Čapljina, a village near Čapljina, Bosnia and Herzegovina